Hemerobius is a genus of lacewings in the family Hemerobiidae. It is found throughout Europe and North America. Like most lacewings, both the larvae and adults are predatory, primarily eating acarines, scale insects, psyllids, aphids, thrips, and the eggs of lepidopterans and whiteflies.

 Names brought to synonymy
 Hemerobius elegans Stephens, 1836 (currently Sympherobius elegans)
 Hemerobius elegans Guérin-Méneville, 1844 (currently Vieira elegans)

See also
 List of Hemerobius species

References

External links

 
 

Hemerobiiformia
Neuroptera genera
Neuroptera of Europe